Walthall is a surname, first name, and place name. It may refer to:

Surname
 Walthall (surname), of English extraction

People
 Edward C. Walthall (1831–1898), American Confederate general and politician
 Henry B. Walthall (1878–1936), American actor
 Madison Walthall (1792–1848), American politician
 Thomas Walthall, Master of the Mercers' Company (1611)
 William Walthall, Master of the Mercers' Company (1605)
 William Walthall, patentee of land in Virginia in 1654 that became Port Walthall
 Walthall Robertson Joyner (1854–1925), the 40th mayor of Atlanta, Georgia
 Walthall M. Moore (1886-1960), a politician from St. Louis and first African American to serve in the Missouri state legislature

Places
 Walthall, Mississippi, a village in Webster County
 Walthall County, Mississippi, a county in that state
 Walthall Mill, Virginia, an incorporated area in Chesterfield County
 Port Walthall, a former town on the Appomattox River in Chesterfield County, Virginia

Other
 Walthall County School District, is a public school district based in Tylertown, Mississippi
 Walthall School (Hattiesburg, Mississippi), is a former public school on the National Register of Historic Places
 Battle of Port Walthall Junction, fought May 6–7, 1864, between Union and Confederate forces during the American Civil War